Łany may refer to the following places in Poland:
Łany, Lower Silesian Voivodeship (south-west Poland)
Łany, Krasnystaw County in Lublin Voivodeship (east Poland)
Łany, Kraśnik County in Lublin Voivodeship (east Poland)
Łany, Puławy County in Lublin Voivodeship (east Poland)
Łany, Jędrzejów County in Świętokrzyskie Voivodeship (south-central Poland)
Łany, Opatów County in Świętokrzyskie Voivodeship (south-central Poland)
Łany, Silesian Voivodeship (south Poland)
Łany, Opole Voivodeship (south-west Poland)
Łany, West Pomeranian Voivodeship (north-west Poland)